The 1928–29 Prima Divisione was a lower national league of the 29th Italian football championship.

In 1928, the fascists allowed the FIGC to complete the reform of the league structure of Italian football. The top-level league was the National Division, composed by the two divisions of Serie A and Serie B. Under them, there were the local championship, the major one being the First Division, that in 1935 will take the name of Serie C. The winners of the three groups of First Division would be promoted to Serie B, whereas the scheduled relegations were annulled by the Federation which expanded the division.

Teams 
To close the claims of the Northern clubs which had been excluded from the national championships in 1926, half of the members of this tournament were taken from the Second Division: so, the DDS took quite the same members of the disbanded pre-1926 Lega Nord. 21 teams were members of the previous season, 21 promoted or invited club from the Second Division plus Grion Pola as last-minute team were added. Southern clubs were excluded.

Regulation 
Three groups of 14 teams, twenty-six matchdays. Group winners were promoted, ultimate and penultimate clubs should be relegated. A national title was assigned.

Group A
Western Group

Spezia promoted to Serie B 1929-30

Group B
Central Group

Parma promoted to Serie B 1929-30
Valenzana disbanded

Group C
Eastern Group

Monfalcone promoted to Serie B 1929-30
Trento relegated for money problem 
Fiume disbanded

Finals

Spezia First Division Champions

Notes

1928-1929
3
Italy